Xinhua is a town of Funing County in southeastern Yunnan province, China, located in the immediate vicinity of the county seat some  east-northeast of Wenshan City; G80 Guangzhou–Kunming Expressway and China National Highway 323. , it has three residential communities (社区) and nine villages under its administration.

References

Township-level divisions of Wenshan Zhuang and Miao Autonomous Prefecture